Yevgeni Nikolayevich Toloknov (born 28 January 1978) is a former Russian professional footballer.

Club career
He made his professional debut in the Russian Third Division in 1995 for FC Spartak-d Moscow.

Honours
 Russian Premier League champion: 1996.

References

1978 births
Footballers from Moscow
Living people
Russian footballers
Association football midfielders
FC Spartak Moscow players
FC Oryol players
Russian Premier League players
FC Spartak-2 Moscow players